The 1944 United States presidential election in Arkansas took place on November 7, 1944, as part of the 1944 United States presidential election. State voters chose nine representatives, or electors, to the Electoral College, who voted for president and vice president.

Arkansas was won by incumbent President Franklin D. Roosevelt (D–New York), running with Senator Harry S. Truman, with 69.95% of the popular vote, against Governor Thomas E. Dewey (R–New York), running with Governor John W. Bricker, with 29.84% of the popular vote.

Results

Results by county

See also
 United States presidential elections in Arkansas

References

Arkansas
1944
1944 Arkansas elections